Wakkund  or Vakkund is a village in the southern state of Karnataka, India. It is located in the Bailhongal taluk of Belgaum district in Karnataka.

Demographics
 India census, Wakkund had a population of 5198 with 2713 males and 2485 females.

See also
 Belgaum
 Districts of Karnataka

References

External links

 http://Belgaum.nic.in/

Villages in Belagavi district